Bayil Arena is a stadium in Bayil, Baku, Azerbaijan. It was opened in 2012 and has a capacity of 3,200 spectators. The stadium is owned and operated by AFFA.  Yalchin Mammadov is a current stadium manager.

History 
The stadium was one of the venues for the group stages of the 2012 FIFA U-17 Women's World Cup. Three Group matches were played there.

References

See also
List of football stadiums in Azerbaijan

Football venues in Baku